Calpulli Airport,  is an airstrip  east of Paillaco, a town in the Los Ríos Region of Chile.

See also

Transport in Chile
List of airports in Chile

References

External links
OpenStreetMap - Calpulli
OurAirports - Calpulli
FallingRain - Calpulli Airport

Airports in Atacama Region